
Gmina Krasiczyn is a rural gmina (administrative district) in Przemyśl County, Subcarpathian Voivodeship, in south-eastern Poland.

The gmina contains part of the protected area called Pogórze Przemyskie Landscape Park.

Villages
Gmina Krasiczyn contains the villages and settlements of Brylińce, Chołowice, Cisowa, Dybawka, Korytniki, Krasice, Krasiczyn, Krzeczkowa, Mielnów, Olszany, Prałkowce, Rokszyce, Śliwnica, Tarnawce and Zalesie.

Neighbouring gminas
Gmina Krasiczyn is bordered by the city of Przemyśl and by the gminas of Bircza, Fredropol, Krzywcza and Przemyśl.

References

 Polish official population figures 2006

Krasiczyn
Przemyśl County